This is a list of Danish television related events from 1955.

Events

Debuts

Television shows

Ending this year

Births
16 October - Søren Pilmark, actor

See also
 1955 in Denmark

Deaths